CD99 antigen-like protein 2 is a protein that in humans is encoded by the CD99L2 gene.

References

External links

Further reading